Trevor Angove (born 15 January 1959) is a former English List A cricketer who played his only List A game for Cornwall Cricket Club, in which he scored 13 and did not bowl.

He also played 71 Minor Counties Championship games and 3 Minor counties trophy games for Cornwall.

References

1959 births
English cricketers
Cornwall cricketers
Living people